Achromobacter marplatensis is a Gram-negative bacterium from the genus Achromobacter which was isolated from a pentachlorophenol-contaminated soil in Mar del Plata by Murialdo et al.

References

External links
Type strain of Achromobacter marplatensis at BacDive -  the Bacterial Diversity Metadatabase

Burkholderiales
Bacteria described in 2011